Broad Street  may refer to:

Nigeria 
 Broad Street, Lagos

United Kingdom
Broad Street, Reading, Berkshire
Broad Street, Bristol
Broad Street, East Sussex, a location
Broad Street, Kent, in Hollingbourne, Maidstone
Broad Street, Lyminge, a location in Folkestone and Hythe, Kent
Broad Street, Monks Horton, a location in Folkestone and Hythe, Kent
Broad Street, Medway, a location in Kent
Broad Street (ward), in London
Broad Street railway station (England), in London
Broad Street, Oxford, Oxfordshire
Broad Street, Suffolk, hamlet near Groton
Broad Street, Birmingham, West Midlands
Broad Street, Wiltshire
Broad Street, Aberdeen, Scotland
Broadwick Street, Soho, London, formerly Broad Street
High Holborn, London, formerly Broad Street

United States
 Broad Street (Athens, Georgia) on the boundary of Downtown Athens (Georgia)
 Broad Street (Augusta, Georgia), mostly signed as U.S. Route 25 Business
 Broad Street, Monroe, Georgia, also signed as State Route 11
 Broad Street, Boston, Massachusetts, site of the Broad Street Riot of 1837
 Broad Street (Red Bank, New Jersey)
 Broad Street (Manhattan), New York City
 Broad Street (Columbus, Ohio), major street that goes through the center of the city
 Broad Street (Johnstown), Pennsylvania
 Broad Street (Philadelphia), Pennsylvania, main north–south route through Philadelphia
 Broad Street (Charleston, South Carolina)
 Broad Street (Richmond, Virginia),  road through Richmond
 East Broad Street, Savannah, Georgia
 Martin Luther King Jr. Boulevard (Savannah), formerly known as West Broad Street

See also
Broad Street Historic District (disambiguation)
Broad Street Station (disambiguation), railroad stations
Broad Avenue, Memphis, Tennessee, USA
The Broad Highway
Broad Freeway
Broadway (disambiguation)